Emblemaria diphyodontis, the Venezuelan blenny, is a species of chaenopsid blenny found around Cubagua Island, Venezuela, in the western Atlantic ocean. It can reach a maximum length of  TL.

Emblemaria diphyodontis has 20-22 dorsal spines, 13-15 dorsal soft rays, 2 anal spines, and 22-24 anal soft rays. It is a harmless species that feeds on small invertebrates and is not evaluated by CITES or CMS. Emblemaria diphyodontis has a low vulnerability to fishing.

References
 Stephens, J.S. Jr., 1970 (1 June) Seven new chaenopsid blennies from the western Atlantic. Copeia 1970 (no. 2): 280–309.

diphyodontis
Fish described in 1970
Taxa named by John S. Stephens Jr.
Taxa named by Fernando Cervigón